The 1st Strategic Aerospace Division (1st STRAD) is an inactive United States Air Force organization. Its last assignment was with Strategic Air Command, assigned to Fifteenth Air Force, being stationed at Vandenberg Air Force Base, California. It was inactivated on 1 September 1991.

The division directed and supervised heavy bombardment (1943–1945) and fighter (1944–1945) operations during World War II within the Eighth Air Force in the European Theater.

Replacing the Eighth Air Force in Okinawa in June 1946, the division directed fighter reconnaissance and bomber organizations, and provided air defense for the Ryukyu Islands, Japan until December 1948.

From 1954 to 1955, the division served as a holding unit at Westover Air Force Base, Massachusetts, for personnel of Eighth Air Force, who moved to the base as part of a transfer of Eighth's headquarters from Carswell Air Force Base, Texas.

Activated again under the Air Research and Development Command in April 1957, it was the first division level organization controlling intermediate range and intercontinental ballistic missiles. It became an operational component of Strategic Air Command (SAC) in January 1958 and began operational testing of missile systems, supporting missile launchings by SAC and other agencies, and training SAC missilemen. These missions continued until the final disbandment on 1 September 1991.

Lineage
 Established as the 1st Bombardment Division on 30 August 1943
 Activated on 13 September 1943
 Redesignated 1st Air Division on 19 December 1944
 Inactivated on 31 October 1945
 Activated on 7 June 1946
 Inactivated on 1 December 1948
 Activated on 1 July 1954
 Inactivated on 1 April 1955
 Redesignated 1st Air Division (Meteorological Survey) on 12 April 1955
 Activated on 15 April 1955
 Inactivated on 20 May 1956
 Redesignated 1st Missile Division on 18 March 1957
 Activated on 15 April 1957
 Redesignated 1st Strategic Aerospace Division on 21 July 1961
 Redesignated Strategic Missile Center on 31 July 1990
 Inactivated on 1 September 1991

Assignments
 VIII Bomber Command (later, Eighth Air Force), 13 September 1943
 VIII Fighter Command, 16 July – 31 October 1945
 Pacific Air Command, U.S. Army (later Far East Air Forces), 7 June 1946 – 1 December 1948
 Eighth Air Force, 1 July 1954 – 1 April 1955
 Strategic Air Command, 15 April 1955 – 20 May 1956
 Air Research and Development Command, 15 April 1957
 Strategic Air Command, 1 January 1958
 Fifteenth Air Force, 1 September 1988 – 1 September 1991

Stations
 Brampton Grange, United Kingdom, 13 September 1943
 RAF Alconbury, United Kingdom, 16 September – 31 October 1945
 Kadena (later Kadena Army Air Base, Kadena Air Force Base), Okinawa, 7 June 1946 – 1 December 1948
 Westover Air Force Base, Massachusetts, 1 July 1954 – 1 April 1955
 Offutt Air Force Base, Nebraska, 15 April 1955 – 20 May 1956
 Inglewood, CA, 15 April 1957
 Cooke Air Force Base (later Vandenberg Air Force Base), California, 16 July 1957 – 1 September 1991

Components
Divisions
 301st Fighter Division (Provisional): 18 August – 16 September 1948 (not operational entire period)
 316th Air Division: See 316th Bombardment Wing below

Wings
 (World War II)
 1st Combat Bombardment Wing (later 1st Bombardment Wing): 13 September 1943 – 12 August 1945
 2d Bombardment Wing: 31 July – 12 August 1945
 40th Combat Bombardment Wing (later 40th Bombardment Wing): 13 September 1943 – 26 September 1945
 41st Combat Bombardment Wing (later 41st Bombardment Wing): 13 September 1943 – 1 June 1945
 67th Fighter Wing: attached 6 October – 31 December 1944, assigned 1 January – 12 August 1945
 92d Combat Bombardment Wing: 1 December – c. 11 December 1943
 94th Combat Bombardment Wing (later 94 Bombardment Wing): 12 December 1943 – 18 June 1945
 101st Provisional Heavy Bombardment Combat: attached 13–16 September 1943
 102d Provisional Heavy Bombardment Combat: attached 13–16 September 1943
 103d Provisional Heavy Bombardment Combat: attached 13–16 September 1943

 (United States Air Force)
 32d Composite Wing: 24 August – 1 December 1948
 51st Fighter Wing: 18 August – 1 December 1948.
 71st Tactical Reconnaissance Wing: 18 August – 25 October 1948 (not operational, and detached, 24 August – 25 October 1948)
 301st Fighter Wing: 7 June 1946 – 1 December 1948 (not operational, 18 August – 1 December 1948)
 316th Bombardment Wing (later 316th Air Division): 7 June 1946 – 21 June 1948
 392d Strategic Missile Wing: 18 October – 20 December 1961
 456th Troop Carrier Wing: attached c. 15 April 1955 – 26 March 1956
 703d Strategic Missile Wing: 25 September 1958 – 15 January 1959
 704th Strategic Missile Wing: 1 August 1957 – 1 July 1959 (not operational 6 April – 1 July 1959)
 706th Strategic Missile Wing: 23 February 1958 – 16 January 1959
 4320th Strategic Wing (Missile): 1–23 February 1958
 4392d Aerospace Support Wing: 21 July – 20 December 1961, 1 July 1987 – 15 January 1991
 Strategic Missile, Provisional: attached 1 January – 1 February 1958 (became 4320th Strategic Wing subsequently)

Groups
 6th Bombardment Group: 1 June 1947 – 18 October 1948 (not operational)
 71st Tactical Reconnaissance Group: attached 18 August – 1 November 1948
 93d Bombardment Group: attached 24 May – 25 August 1948
 94th Bombardment Group: 12 August – 26 September 1945
 96th Bombardment Group: 12 August – 26 September 1945
 98th Bombardment Group: attached 25 August – 1 December 1948
 100th Bombardment Group: 12 August – 26 September 1945
 4000th Support Group (later other designations): 1966–1983

Squadrons
 644th Strategic Missile Squadron: April–December 1959, attached 6 Apr-30 Jun 1959, assigned 1 Jul-l Nov 1959 (never operational). 
 864 Strategic Missile (later, 864 Technical Training): attached 1 Nov 1958-30 Jun 1959, assigned 1 Jul 1959-1 Jun 1960. 
 865 Strategic Missile (later, 865 Technical Training): attached 1 Nov 1958-30 Jun 1959, assigned 1 Jul-1 Nov 1959. 
 866 Strategic Missile (later, 866 Technical Training): attached 1 Nov 1958-30 Jun 1959, assigned 1 Jul 1959-25 May 1962 (not operational, 17-25 May 1962)
 4315th Combat Crew Training Squadron
 Others, including 6 Troop Carrier: attached 10 Jun 1946-c. Apr 1947. 25 Liaison: 30 Mar-15 Sep 1947. 36 Bombardment: 21 Nov 1943-27 Feb 1944 (detached 4 Dec 1943-27 Feb 1944); 1 Jan-12 Aug 1945; 1 Sep-Oct 1945. 392 Missile Training: attached 6 Apr-30 Jun 1959, assigned 1 Jul 1959-18 Oct 1961; assigned 20 Dec 1961-1 Feb 1963. 394 Missile Training (later, 394 Strategic Missile; 394 ICBM Test Maintenance): attached 6 Apr-15 Dec 1958; assigned 1 Jul 1960-18 Oct 1961; assigned 20 Dec 1961-1 Sep 1991. 395 Missile Training (later 395 Strategic Missile): attached 6 Apr-30 Jun 1959, assigned 1 Jul 1959-18 Oct 1961; assigned 20 Dec 1961-31 Dec 1969. 406 Bombardment: c. 11 Nov 1943-26 Feb 1944 (detached 4 Dec 1943-21 Feb 1944); 30 Dec 1944-5 Aug 1945. 576 Strategic Missile: attached 6 Apr-30 Jun 1959, assigned 1 Jul 1959-18 Oct 1961; assigned 20 Dec 1961-2 Apr 1966. 6652 Bombardment: 13 Jul-25 Aug 1945; 1 Sep-12 Oct 1945. 857 Bombardment: attached 10 Mar-c. Aug 1945.

Aircraft and missiles operated
From{{refn|group=note|name=1SADlists|See''' list in Air Force Historical Research Agency Factsheet, 1 Strategic Aerospace Division}}

Aircraft
Boeing B-17 Flying Fortress, 1943–1945
Consolidated B-24 Liberator, 1943–1945
North American P-51 Mustang, 1944–1945
Boeing B-29 Superfortress 1946–1948
Republic P-47 Thunderbolt, 1944, 1946–1948
Northrop P-61 Black Widow, 1946–1948
Lockheed F-80 Shooting Star, 1947–1948
B/ERB-17, 1946–1948
B-25, 1946
B-29/F-13, 1946–1947
Beechcrat C-45 Expeditor, 1946
Curtiss C-46 Commando, 1946–1947
L-4, 1946
L-5, 1946–1948
OA-10, 1946–1947
R-6, 1946
B/FB-17, 1948
RB-29, 1948
F-2, 1948
C-119, 1955–1956

Missile systems
PGM-17 Thor, 1958–1962
SM-65 Atlas, 1958–1966
PGM-19 Jupiter, 1958–1962
SM-68 Titan, 1960–1969
Minuteman I, 1961–1975
LGM-25C Titan II, 1962–1977
Minuteman II, 1966
Minuteman III, 1971–1991.

See also
 List of United States Air Force air divisions

Notes

References

General references

 Berger, Carl. History of the 1st Missile Division. Santa Barbara County, California: Vandenberg Air Force Base, 1960.
 Bishop, Cliff T. Fortresses of the Big Triangle First: A History of the Aircraft Assigned to the First Bombardment Wing and the First Bombardment Division of the Eighth Air Force for August 1942-31 March 1944. Bishop's Stortford, UK: East Anglia Books, 1986. .
 Bowman, Martin W. Airfields of 1st Air Division (USAAF): Cambridgeshire * Northamptonshire * Bedfordshire. Barnsley, South Yorkshire, UK: Pen and Sword Books, 2007. .
 Mackay, Ron. First in the Field: The 1st Air Division over Europe in WWII. Atglen, Pennsylvania: Schiffer Publishing, 2007. .
 * Merritt, Robert F. 1st Air Division, Okinawa. Okinawan, Japan: McFadden, 1947.
 
 USAF. History and Lineage: 1st Strategic Aerospace Division, 1st Bombardment Division, 1st Air Division, 1st Missile Division''. Santa Barbara County, California: Vandenberg Air Force Base, 1981.

001
Military units and formations disestablished in 1991
1943 establishments in England
1991 disestablishments in California